CIKZ-FM (106.7 MHz) is a commercial FM radio station in Kitchener, Ontario, Canada. The station airs a country format branded as Country 106.7 and is owned by Rogers Sports & Media, which also owns sister stations CHYM-FM and CKGL. CIKZ's studios are at The Boardwalk in Kitchener. 

CIKZ has an effective radiated power (ERP) of 1,700 watts (5,000 watts maximum). The transmitter is on Wilby Road near Wilmot Line in Wilmot.

History
CIKZ was licensed to Larche Communications, the station's original owner, by the Canadian Radio-Television and Telecommunications Commission in 2003.  It began broadcasting on February 6, 2004 at 99.5 FM. However, the station later changed to 106.7 FM in 2005, due to interference from WDCX-FM in Buffalo.

On June 4, 2007, Larche announced a deal to sell CIKZ to Rogers in exchange for CICX-FM in Orillia. The deal, which was approved by the Canadian Radio-television and Telecommunications Commission (CRTC) on December 24, 2007, placed CIKZ in its Kitchener cluster, along with Rogers' existing CKGL and CHYM-FM.

On January 28, 2008, the station modified its on-air identity to reflect the new ownership. This included some of the on-air personalities and its web site, as well as the adjustment of its branding and logo from KICX (the spelling used by Larche) to KIX. Shortly thereafter, Rogers moved the station's studios, previously in Waterloo, to the Rogers facility in downtown Kitchener.

On May 30, 2013, the station was rebranded as Country 106.7, as part of Rogers' rebranding of its country-formatted stations to a unified brand.

References

External links
 Country 106.7
 
 

Ikz
Ikz
Ikz
Radio stations established in 2004
2004 establishments in Ontario